is a railway station in the city of Shimotsuke, Tochigi, Japan, operated by the East Japan Railway Company (JR East).

Lines
Through services to and from the Tokaido Line and Yokosuka Line are also provided via the Shonan-Shinjuku Line and Ueno-Tokyo Line.

Station layout
This station has an elevated station building, located above two opposed side platforms serving two tracks. The station is staffed.

Platforms

History
Ishibashi Station opened on 16 July 1895. With the privatization of JNR on 1 April 1987, the station came under the control of JR East.

Passenger statistics
In fiscal 2019, the station was used by an average of 4860 passengers daily (boarding passengers only).

Surrounding area
former Ishibashi town hall
Ishibashi Post Office

References

External links

   JR East station information 

Stations of East Japan Railway Company
Railway stations in Tochigi Prefecture
Tōhoku Main Line
Utsunomiya Line
Railway stations in Japan opened in 1895
Shōnan-Shinjuku Line
Shimotsuke, Tochigi